Nichola Ann Burley (born 26 December 1986) is an English actress. She is best known for her roles in Born Equal, Drop Dead Gorgeous, Goldplated, Death Comes to Pemberley, Donkey Punch and StreetDance 3D.

Early life
A former pupil of Leeds' Intake High School, Bramley Burley also attended the Northern School of Contemporary Dance in the city as well as spending 5 years at the Walton School of Theatre Dance.

Career
Burley's acting career began in 2005 when she appeared as Michelle in the Dominic Savage film Love + Hate.

She's had guest roles in The Ghost Squad, in November 2005, and Shameless in February 2006. In September 2006 Channel 4 show Goldplated debuted with Burley playing a main role in the ensemble cast. Due to low ratings, a second season was never commissioned.

In November 2006 she received fame for her role as Zoe, in Savage's improvised, one-off BBC drama Born Equal. The BBC described the show as one which "addresses social inequality in Britain today." Directed and written by Savage again, the film also starred Robert Carlyle, Anne-Marie Duff and Colin Firth. As part of her research for the show she travelled to meet young runaways in London.

She has also starred as Cathy McAleer in BBC Three show Drop Dead Gorgeous throughout its first series in 2006 and its second in 2007.

In 2010, she appeared in the dance film StreetDance 3D as the lead role alongside George Sampson, Diversity and Flawless. She portrays Isabella Linton in a 2011 film adaptation of Wuthering Heights. She appeared as Witney Whitehead in the BBC drama Candy Cabs which began on 5 April 2011. She also starred in one episode of crime drama Lewis on ITV 1.

Her stage credits include the title role in Bollywood Jane at the West Yorkshire Playhouse throughout June 2007 and Constanza in a Sheffield revival of Peter Schaffer's Amadeus.

Filmography

Film

Television

References

External links

1986 births
Living people
English film actresses
English stage actresses
English television actresses
People from Harehills
Actresses from Leeds
Actresses from Yorkshire